Rai Bahadur Daya Ram Sahni CIE (16 December 1879 – 7 March 1939) was an Indian archaeologist who supervised the excavation of the Indus valley site at Harappa in 1920 to  1921 But the first report of Harappan excavations came out in 1921, 29 March by John Marshall. Due to which various historians have chosen 1921 AD as the time of Harappan excavation. A protege of John Marshall, in 1931, Sahni became the first Indian to be appointed Director-General of the Archaeological Survey of India (ASI), a position in which he served till 1935.

Early life and education 

Daya Ram Sahni hailed from the city of Bhera in Shahpur district, Punjab where he was born on 16 December 1879. Sahni graduated in Sanskrit from the Punjab University with a gold medal. He also topped the M. A. examination from the Oriental College in 1903. As a result of this accomplishments, Sahni won the Sanskrit scholarship sponsored by the Archaeological Survey of India and recruited by the survey on completion of his education.

As archaeologist 

In 1903, Sahni was posted to the Punjab and United Provinces circle where he worked under J. Ph. Vogel. Sahni was involved in the excavation of Kasia in 1905 and Rajgir in Bihar under John Marshall in January–February 1906. In September 1907, Sahni assisted Marshall in the excavation of a stupa at Rampurva in Champaran district. He also prepared a catalogue of archaeological ruins at Sarnath.

Sahni worked as curator of Lucknow Museum from 1911 to 1912, when he was transferred to the archaeology department of Kashmir state. Sahni returned to Lahore in 1917 and was made incharge of United Provinces and Punjab. While working as Assistant Superintendent, Sahni excavated the Indus Valley site at Harappa, the first of the Indus Valley sites to be excavated.

In the 1920 ASI Reports, Daya Ram Sahni describes his explorations from 1917 as he conducted preliminary investigations from ancient site near Harappa in the Montgomery District.

In 1925, Sahni was transferred to Delhi as Deputy Director-General of the Archaeological Survey of India and in July 1931, he succeeded Hargeaves as the Director-General of the ASI. Sahni was the first native Indian to be appointed to the post.

Honours 

Sahni was awarded a "Rai Bahadur" medal in March 1920 by the Governor of Punjab at a durbar in Rawalpindi. Soon after his retirement from the ASI in 1935, Sahni was made a Companion of the Order of the Indian Empire. archaeologist

References 

 

1879 births
1939 deaths
Companions of the Order of the Indian Empire
20th-century Indian archaeologists
Directors General of the Archaeological Survey of India
19th-century Indian archaeologists
Scientists from Punjab, India
People associated with the Indus Valley civilisation
Indian institute directors
Archaeologists in British India